Stacy Johnson or Stacey Johnson may refer to:

Stacy Johnson
 Stacy Johnson (singer) (1945–2017) American R&B singer and songwriter
 Stacy Johnson (born ), winner of the 2003 Miss Utah pageant
 Stacy May-Johnson (born 1984), American, former collegiate, 3-time professional All-Star right-handed softball player

Stacey Johnson
 Stacey Johnson (fencer), former Olympic fencer
 Stacey Johnson, member of the winning women's U23 team at the 2008 European Cross Country Championships